Lee v Lee's Air Farming Ltd [1960] UKPC 33 is a company law case from New Zealand, also important for UK company law and Indian Companies Act 2013, concerning the corporate veil and separate legal personality. The Judicial Committee of the Privy Council reasserted that a company is a separate legal entity, so that a director could still be under a contract of employment with the company he solely owned.

Facts
Catherine Lee's husband Geoffrey Lee formed the company through Christchurch accountants, which worked in Canterbury, New Zealand. It spread fertilisers on farmland from the air, known as top dressing. Mr Lee held 2999 of 3000 shares, was the sole director and employed as the chief pilot. He was killed in a plane crash. Mrs Lee wished to claim damages of 2,430 pounds under the Workers' Compensation Act 1922 for the death of her husband, and he needed to be a 'worker', or 'any person who has entered into or works under a contract of service... with an employer... whether remunerated by wages, salary or otherwise.' The company was insured (as required) for worker compensation.

The Court of Appeal of New Zealand said Lee could not be a worker when he was in effect also the employer. North J said "the two offices are clearly incompatible. There would exist no power of control and therefore the relationship of master-servant was not created."

Advice
The Privy Council advised that Mrs Lee was entitled to compensation, since it was perfectly possible for Mr Lee to have a contract with the company he owned. The company was a separate legal person. Lord Morris of Borth-y-Gest said:

See also

Salomon v. A. Salomon & Co. Ltd.
DHN Food Distributors Ltd. v. Tower Hamlets London Borough Council
Adams v. Cape Industries plc

Notes

United Kingdom corporate personality case law
United Kingdom company case law
Judicial Committee of the Privy Council cases on appeal from New Zealand
1960 in case law
1960 in New Zealand law